Lincoln Henry Jelliff (26 April 1865 – 24 September 1948) served as a Member of Parliament in the Lethbridge riding from 1921 to 1930. He was born in Oneida, Illinois, United States. He was elected as a Progressive in 1921 Canadian federal election and 1925 and was then re-elected in 1926 representing the United Farmers of Alberta. He did not run for re-election in 1930 and retired from parliament.

References

External links

 Southwestern Alberta Obituaries
 

1865 births
1962 deaths
American emigrants to Canada
Businesspeople in insurance
Members of the House of Commons of Canada from Alberta
People from Oneida, Illinois
Progressive Party of Canada MPs
United Farmers of Alberta MPs